Cyclotron is the third album by Blind Idiot God, released in 1992 through Avant Records. It became the band's final studio album for twenty-three years after drummer Ted Epstein left the band in 1996, causing the band to go on an indefinite hiatus. Cyclotron remains Blind Idiot God's last album recorded with the original line-up intact.

Composer Bill Laswell, who had worked with the band on their previous album, returned to fill production duties. Guitarist Andy Hawkins began utilizing more feedback and looping techniques in the music, which he would further explore on Halo, his solo guitar project.

Critical reception 

In writing for allmusic, Brian Olewnick noted that the trio were immensely talented and erudite musicians capable of playing music that was "head and shoulders over most thrash-influenced math rock." Despite this, Olewnick concluded that the group showed little artistic growth and "it was becoming clear that this particular well was beginning to show signs of dryness and that perhaps the band members would be advised to think of drilling elsewhere." Jakubowski of The Wire shared similar criticisms, stating that, despite the material being some of the strongest the group had released, that the music lacked progression.

Track listing

Personnel 
Adapted from the Cyclotron liner notes.

Blind Idiot God
Ted Epstein – drums
Andy Hawkins – guitar
Gabriel Katz – bass guitar

Production and additional personnel
Ted Barron – photography
Martin Bisi – engineering
Oz Fritz – engineering, mixing
Tomoyo T.L. Karath – design
Bill Laswell – production
Robert Musso – engineering
Howie Weinberg – mastering

Release history

References 

1992 albums
Blind Idiot God albums
Albums produced by Bill Laswell
Avant Records albums